Anemone Is Not the Enemy is a 2020 children's picture book by Anna McGregor. It is about a lonely anemone who lives in a tide pool and cannot make friends as she keeps stinging everyone, but eventually does so with a clown fish.

Publication history
2021, USA, Scribe 
2020, Australia, Scribble

Reception
A reviewer for Reading Time called it a "fun and funny picture book", and recommended it "for young readers especially those interested in the natural world.". Kirkus Reviews found that it "Suggests a human lesson from a fish fact made familiar by a popular children’s film."

Anemone Is Not the Enemy has also been reviewed by The Bulletin of the Center for Children's Books, Books+Publishing, and Publishers Weekly.

It is a 2021 CBCA Book of the Year Early Childhood notable book, and a 2021 Australian Book Industry Awards Small publisher Children's Book of the Year longlisted book.

References

External links

Library holdings of Anemone Is Not the Enemy

Australian picture books
2020 children's books
Scribe (publisher) books